Tom Ang is a photographer, author, traveller, and academic.

In 1979 he was a founding member of Wandsworth Photo Co-op which grew into Photofusion, London's largest independent photography resource  A specialist in travel and digital photography, he has photographed extensively in Central Asia. He won the Thomas Cook Travel Book Award for best Illustrated Travel Book. He won the HIPA Content Producer Award 2019 Hamdan International Photography Award 2019.  He is a Sony New Zealand digital imaging ambassador  

He is the author of 35 books on photography.

Life and work
Ang was a senior lecturer in photographic practice at the University of Westminster from 1991 to 2004 teaching on the undergraduate photography programmes, as well as on the Masters in Journalism Studies. He also created the MA Photographic Journalism course. For over 10 years he specialized in photographing Central Asia, extensively travelling in Uzbekistan and Kyrgyzstan, with a few visits to Kazakhstan and Tajikistan. He led a Know How Fund project (within the REAP (Regional Academic Partnership) scheme) that helped equip a radio studio for radio students and which reformed the journalism curriculum for the Kyrgyz Russian Slavonic University in Bishkek, Kyrgyzstan.

Ang is a founding member of the World Photographic Academy and helped set up the Student Focus element of the Sony World Photography Awards. He juried the Czech Press Photo in 2009, Hamdan International Photography Award and Wildlife Photographer of the Year.

Ang was the presenter of the BBC series "A Digital Picture of Britain", first transmitted in 2005 on BBC4. A second series, entitled "Britain in Pictures" was transmitted in 2007. He presented an 8-part TV series for Channel News Asia in Singapore which was broadcast in August 2009 (Bronze World Medal, Educational / Instructional, New York Television and Film Awards, 2010).

Books
Photography: History. Art. Technique, 2019 
Digital Photography Essentials, 2016 
The Complete Photographer, 2016, 
Photography – the definitive visual history, 2015, 
Digital Photography Masterclass, 2017, 
Digital Photographer's Handbook (now in 7th edition), 2013, 
How to Photograph Absolutely Everything, 2009, 
Fundamentals of Photography, 2008, 
Eyewitness Companion: Photography, 2005, 
Picture Editing, 2000, 
Tao of Photography, 2000, 
Advanced Digital Photography.
Digital Video Handbook.

Awards
Winner, Photography Content Creator Award, Hamdan International Photography Award 2019.

References

External links

"How to take good photos: Tom Ang presents top tips on how to get the most out of your digital camera". BBC, 2007.
artmatc4U Tom Ang page

New Zealand photographers
Living people
Writers on photographic techniques
Year of birth missing (living people)